The men's canoe sprint K-1 1,000 metres at the 2016 Olympic Games in Rio de Janeiro took place between 15 and 16 August at Lagoa Stadium. The medals were presented by Crown Prince Frederik of Denmark, IOC member, Denmark and Jorn Cronberg, board member of the ICF.

Competition format

The competition comprised heats, semifinals, and a final round.  The top five boats from each heat, and the fastest loser, advanced to the semifinals. The top four boats in each semifinal advanced to the "A" final, and competed for medals.  A placing "B" final was held for the other semifinalists.

Schedule

All times are Brasília Time (UTC−03:00)

Results

Heats
First five and the best 6th placed boat are qualified for the semifinals.

Heat 1

Heat 2

Heat 3

Semifinals
The fastest four canoeists in each semifinal qualify for the 'A' final. The slowest four canoeists in each semifinal qualify for the 'B' final.

Semifinal 1

Semifinal 2

Finals

Final B

Final A

References

Canoeing at the 2016 Summer Olympics
Men's events at the 2016 Summer Olympics